Tianzheng was a Chinese era name used by several emperors of China. It may refer to:

Tianzheng (天正, 551), era name used by Xiao Dong, emperor of the Liang dynasty, later continued by Xiao Ji until 553
Tianzheng (天政, 1103–1104), era name used by Duan Zhengchun, emperor of Dali

See also
Tian Zheng, Chinese-American statistician